Sudoeste/Octogonal is an administrative region in the Federal District in Brazil.

References

External links

 Regional Administration of Sudoeste/Octogonal website
 Government of the Federal District website

Administrative regions of Federal District (Brazil)
Populated places established in 2003